Tenuis, weak or slender in Latin, and a species in zoology, may refer to:

 language
 Tenuis consonant,  a stop or affricate which is unvoiced, unaspirated and unglottalized

 Zoology
 Acropora tenuis is a species of acroporid coral found in the Red Sea, the Gulf of Aden,
 Anatoma tenuis, a species of minute sea snail
 Copulabyssia tenuis, a species of sea snail
 Chromodoris tenuis, a species of colourful sea slug
 Dirofilaria tenuis, a species of nematode parasitic roundworm 
 Hierodula tenuis, a species of praying mantis in the family Mantidae
 Maoricicada tenuis,  a species of insect that is endemic to New Zealand
 Montebello tenuis, a monotypic genus of Australian ground spiders
 Odostomia tenuis, a species of sea snail
 Tenuiphantes tenuis, a species of spider
 Tenuis tetra, a fish species
 Triplophysa tenuis, a species of ray-finned fish